The 1991 African Men's Handball Championship was the ninth edition of the African Men's Handball Championship, held in Cairo, Egypt, from 1 to 15 September 1990. It acted as the African qualifying tournament for the 1992 Summer Olympics in Barcelona.

Egypt finished first in the round robin tournament and wins its first African title. Algeria finished second and Tunisia third.

Qualified teams

Format
8 teams qualified to the final tournament and was divided into two groups as below :

However, because of the withdrawal of Namibia, it was decided to make a round robin tournament format of one final group regrouping the seven participated teams.

Standings

Results

Tournament classification

References

African handball championships
Handball
A
Handball
Handball in Egypt
1990s in Cairo
Sports competitions in Cairo
September 1990 sports events in Africa